The Rivers State Ministry of Special Duties is a ministry of the Government of Rivers State, which develops methods for risk reduction and disaster management. To achieve its goal, the ministry outfits the fire service and emergency management departments with a reliable infrastructure. The current incumbent commissioner is Mr. Bariere Thomas.

Ministry objectives
The vision and policy objectives of the Ministry of Special Duties are:

To bring about relief to distress people and situation.

To extend fire service facilities to the grassroot.

To have a safer, sustainable and resilient society.

Mandate
The ministry’s mandate is to respond to emergencies and provide aid to the victims.

See also
Rivers State Fire Service
Government of Rivers State

References

External links
Rivers State Ministry of Special Duties

Special duties
Firefighting in Rivers State
Public safety ministries